Knud Gøtke (16 August 1886 – 28 May 1963) was a Danish rower. He competed in the men's coxed four event at the 1912 Summer Olympics.

References

1886 births
1963 deaths
Danish male rowers
Olympic rowers of Denmark
Rowers at the 1912 Summer Olympics
Rowers from Copenhagen